Black Hungarians or Black Magyars were a group of the Hungarians during the second half of the 9th century.

Black Hungarians are mentioned in just a few contemporary sources (sometimes in opposition to White Hungarians); none of the sources expands upon the exact nature of the relationship between the Black Magyars and the "mainstream" Hungarian population, nor is the origin and meaning of their name clear.

It is known that they participated in some military campaign in Kiev; after the conquest, they resisted the Christian mission even after the coronation of King Stephen I of Hungary in 1000 or 1001. In 1003, Bruno of Querfurt tried to convert the Black Hungarians; then Azzo, a papal legate, led the missionary work among them, but they insisted on their faith; therefore some of them were blinded.

Around 1008, King Stephen I made a campaign against them and conquered their territories ("Black Hungary").

Sources
Korai Magyar Történeti Lexikon (9-14. század), főszerkesztő: Kristó, Gyula, szerkesztők: Engel, Pál és Makk, Ferenc (Akadémiai Kiadó, Budapest, 1994)

References

External links
 Hungarian History

History of the Hungarians
Baranya (region)
History of Baranya (region)
Hungarian prehistory